Honeymoon with Murder is a book written by Carolyn Hart and published by Bantam Books (now owned by Penguin Random House) on 1 December 1988 which later went on to win the Anthony Award for Best Paperback Original in 1990.

References 

Anthony Award-winning works
American mystery novels
1988 American novels